A publicist is a person whose job is to generate and manage publicity for a company, a brand, or public figure – especially a celebrity – or for a work such as a book, film, or album. Publicists are public relations specialists who have the role to maintain and represent the images of individuals, rather than representing an entire corporation or business. Publicists are also hired by public figures who want to maintain or protect their image. Publicists brand their clients by getting magazine, TV, newspaper, and website coverage. Most top-level publicists work in private practice, handling multiple clients.

The term publicist was coined by the legal scholar Francis Lieber to describe the public-like role of internationalists during the late nineteenth century. Publicists are sometimes called flacks which traces back to Gene Flack, who was a well-known movie publicist in the 1930s.

Description
In the world of celebrities, unlike agents or managers, publicists typically take a monthly fee for serving a client (whereas agents and managers tend to take a percentage of their client's gross income). Publicists can be on a local, regional or national level. For example, a small restaurant seeking only local publicity would want a local publicist – whereas an author seeking nationwide visibility would want to search for a national publicist.

One of the publicist's main functions is to generate press coverage on behalf of their clients and serve as the bridge between clients, their public and media outlets. A publicist manages campaigns and performs other public relations functions. It usually takes many years to develop the media contacts, experience and relationships necessary to be an effective publicist.

Some publicists specialize in representing ordinary members of the public to procure the maximum possible fee for stories they wish to sell to newspapers, television stations, and magazines. A number have now sprung up on the internet and work as media agents gaining members of the public multiple deals with publications.

An older meaning of the term is closer to pamphleteer: someone who circulates ideas by publishing them, perhaps in ephemeral forms. This term is still in use in some countries, such as Israel.

Types of publicists
 Press representative
 Public relations publicist – manages the public image of a client or a work of art such as a film.
 Special publicity consultant
 Unit publicist – The unit publicist brings attention to the production phase of making a film or other work of art by organizing media kits, sending out press releases, and arranging media visits to the production.
 Media agent – liaises between the ordinary person (interviewee) and publications or TV to 'sell' their story.

Role of publicists 
The main role of publicists is to get good press coverage for their clients. One way that publicists can do this is by sending press releases to journalists. A press release is written like a news story; including a headline, and attention grabbing quotes. However, because of the high traffic of e-mails, today, many press releases sent by publicists are lost within the other e-mails that journalists receive.

Publicists tend to have good working relationships with journalists, TV news producers, and producers. In order to have these relationships, publicists usually network with these media professionals. To protect a client's image, publicists will often ask journalists what questions will be asked during interviews to prevent any surprises and discussion of any unwanted topics.

Publicists determine how to manage a person's or brand's image by what is being said about them in the media. This pertains to websites and social media. More recently, publicists have the need to network with bloggers and scope out their websites to make sure the content on their client is appropriate. Celebrity publicists usually schedule their client's press tours, which includes everything from making the travel arrangements and locations.

A typical day for a publicist consists of being on the phone, networking through e-mails, and can make themselves available at all times of the day for when conflict arises. Out of the office, publicists go to gatherings to network with media professionals.

Skills used 
Publicists are usually skilled writers, as well as motivated to promote individuals. Furthermore, publicists need to be able to handle the stress associated with crisis. For example, if a client is arrested for a DUI, they need to release press coverage with details explaining how the client will resolve the situation.  In terms of education, publicists will often major in communications, journalism, or public relations in college.  When starting out as a publicist, one will have to work their way up in regards to position. Usually, it is helpful that aspiring publicists intern at a public relations firm while at college to gain experience.  Schools that offer communication and public relations degrees consist of Ashford University, Colorado Technical University, Seton Hall University, American University, and the University of Florida.

Publicists in the Hollywood industry
Hollywood publicists create and manage relationships between film stars and the array of other media channels through which the identities of stars are circulated. Stars have a dual relationship with publicity, for they publicize films but also, and importantly in the freelance market, have an interest in self publicity. It is for the latter reason that while many stars continue to regard managers as an optional luxury, today the majority of stars in Hollywood hire publicists to manage their media visibility. In other words, celebrities hire publicists who will be able to get their name out to the public preferably in a positive light.

Compared to channels of paid advertising, publicity generates exposure which is relatively "free". Publicity is at work whenever stars make personal appearances at press conferences or film premieres, give television interviews, are displayed on magazine covers, or allow the press to cover a private event. Independent publicists include Hollywood stars and studios as their clients, alongside corporations and individuals from the worlds of entertainment, sports, finance, technology, retailing, and other business sectors.

The role of a publicist in Hollywood has changed and has become more challenging in recent years. With the enormous increase of entertainment news outlets such as Perez Hilton, TMZ, and Page Six, it has become much more difficult for publicists to control negative stories. Publicists must also work much harder to keep some of their star clients relevant in the media with the entertainment options in Hollywood continuously growing. Even booking a star for an interview or on a television talk show has become a challenging task, because if something goes awry, the publicist and the star could both be highly criticized by the media.

Salary 
The average salary for a publicist in the United States is about $45,000 per year. However, celebrity publicists' salaries can vary depending on the clientele they cater to.

Salaries for corporate PR specialists by experience 
 Entry level (0–5 years): $29,029–57,737
 Mid-career (5–10 years): $35,818–76,758
 Experienced (10–20 years): $35,372–96,507
 Late career (20 years+): $34,786–154,954

See also
 Press agent
 Promotion (marketing)

References

 Wignall, Alice, The Guardian, 18 August 2008: "Wanted: real-life Shirley Valentines"

Mass media occupations
Public relations people by role
Theatrical management
Theatrical occupations